Brian Clifford Downey (November 5, 1950 – January 12, 2012) was a politician from Alberta, Canada.

Born in Castor, Alberta to Clifford and Doreen Downey, Brian Downey was first elected to the Legislative Assembly of Alberta for the riding of Stettler as a Progressive Conservative member during the 1986 Alberta general election. He served his first term as a backbencher in the Don Getty government. He was re-elected for his second term in the 1989 Alberta general election.

However, during that election, Premier Don Getty was defeated in his own riding of Edmonton-Whitemud. Downey resigned as the member for Stettler so that Getty could run in a by-election. Under long-standing practice in Westminster systems, if the party leader doesn't have a seat of his own the MLA for a safe seat resigns to give the leader a chance to get into the chamber via a by-election. After Downey retired from politics he was appointed as enhancement co-ordinator of Alberta Hail and Crop Insurance Corporation. He was later appointed Chairman of the Alberta Grain Commission.

Personal life
On January 12, 1971, he married Trudy Fuller of Alliance and they returned to Castor to farm. They had two children, Allison and Dustin.

Brian Downey died in Red Deer in 2012, aged 61, after a brief illness.

References

External links
Embarrassment for Getty CBC Archives
Alberta Hansard March 26, 1991
Alberta Hansard April 21, 1993

1950 births
2012 deaths
Progressive Conservative Association of Alberta MLAs